In Blue is the third studio album by Irish pop rock band the Corrs, released in 2000 which saw the band become known in the United States. The title of the album comes from a lyric in the song "Give Me a Reason". As well as the UK number one single "Breathless", the album also contains new versions of "Radio" and "At Your Side", which had appeared on their previous album The Corrs Unplugged. Mutt Lange co-wrote and produced three songs from the album.

Several of the tracks were used in various television programmes and films: "Rebel Heart" as the theme for the TV miniseries of the same name; "One Night" in Mad About Mambo; "At Your Side" in Say It Isn't So and the trailer for the film The Holiday; and "All the Love in the World" in the film America's Sweethearts.

Track listing

Special edition

Personnel

The band
Andrea Corr – lead vocals, tin whistle
Caroline Corr – drums, bodhran, piano, vocals
Jim Corr – guitar, keyboards, piano, vocals
Sharon Corr – violin, vocals

Featuring
Anthony Drennan – guitars, lead guitar
Keith Duffy – bass guitar

Guest musicians
Ronan Dooney – trumpet
Paul Duffy – saxophone
Mitchell Froom – keyboards
Billy Farrell – keyboards
Fiachra Trench – string arrangement

Production
Producers: The Corrs, Robert John "Mutt" Lange, DFHM, Mitchell Froom, Billy Farrell, John Hughes
Engineer: Tim Martin
Assistant engineer: Frances Murphy
Mixing: Adam Olmsted, Mike Shipley
Pre-programming: Richard Meyer aka Swayd
Programming: Richard Meyer aka Swayd, Cory Churko, Oisin Murry
String arrangements: Fiachra Trench
Production consultant: Mitchell Froom
Art direction: Elizabeth Barrett
Design: Andrea Brooks
Photography: Rankin, Norman Jean Roy

Charts

Weekly charts

Year-end charts

Decade-end chart

Certifications

Release history

References

Atlantic Records albums
143 Records albums
2000 albums
The Corrs albums
Albums produced by Robert John "Mutt" Lange